The first season of the American television series Empire premiered on January 7, 2015, and concluded on March 18, 2015, on Fox. The series centers around a hip hop music and entertainment company, Empire Entertainment, and the drama among the members of the founders' family as they fight for control. The show aired on Wednesdays at 9:00 pm ET. The season consisted of 12 episodes.

The first episode was watched by 9.90 million viewers and achieved an adult 18-49 rating/share of 3.8/11, making it the biggest series launch for the network since Touch premiered in 2012. The viewership of the series rose every single week, with the season finale, which aired on March 18, 2015, being watched by 17.62 million viewers and achieving an adult 18-49 rating/share of 6.9/21.

Premise 
The show centers around a hip hop music and entertainment company, Empire Entertainment, and the drama among the members of the founders' family as they fight for control of the company.

Cast and characters

Main cast 
 Terrence Howard as Lucious Lyon
 Taraji P. Henson as Cookie Lyon
 Bryshere Y. Gray as Hakeem Lyon
 Jussie Smollett as Jamal Lyon
 Trai Byers as Andre Lyon
 Grace Gealey as Anika Calhoun
 Malik Yoba as Vernon Turner
 Kaitlin Doubleday as Rhonda Lyon

Recurring cast

Guest appearances

Production

Casting 
Howard was cast in the lead on February 19, 2014. Henson was named as the female lead on February 26, and Jussie Smollett was announced in a starring role. Howard and Henson previously starred together as love interests in the film Hustle & Flow. On March 10, 2014, Sidibe, who had previously worked with Daniels in Precious, was cast in a recurring role as Becky, Lucious' assistant. Trai Byers and Grace Gealey were announced in regular roles, while Bryshere Y. Gray and Malik Yoba were announced in starring roles. Naomi Campbell was announced in a recurring role on September 29. Courtney Love was added to the cast on October 23.

Episodes

Reception

Critical response 
Empire was well received by critics, with most praising Taraji's performance as Cookie. On Rotten Tomatoes the show got a rating of 80% fresh based on 49 reviews.

Live + SD ratings

Live + 7 Day (DVR) ratings

References

2015 American television seasons
Empire (2015 TV series) seasons
Television series set in 1998
Television series set in the 2000s